Sarah Walker (born 1965) is an Australian author, screenwriter and script producer. She has written for several serial dramas, including Home and Away, Neighbours, and All Saints. She co-created the comedy drama Wonderland with Jo Porter in 2013. Walker has also written novels and worked as a journalist and actor, appearing in Man of Flowers (1983).

Early and personal life
Walker was born and raised in Sydney. As a teenager she wrote scripts, and she briefly worked as an actress. She studied creative writing while working in the magazine industry, and she has a BA Communication from the University of Technology Sydney. She was the chief subeditor of New Weekly.

Walker is openly lesbian and came out when she was 16.

Career
Walker received a publishing contract for two novels, and she wrote the coming out story The Year of Freaking Out in 1997. She began her screen writing career with the serial drama Breakers. Following its cancellation, she moved onto Home and Away and All Saints. She helped create the character Charlotte Beaumont (played by Tammy MacIntosh), who was initially a lesbian, however, when Walker left the serial, Charlotte became straight. Walker has written for Neighbours, HeadLand, and A Place To Call Home. She helped develop Winners & Losers and co-created Wonderland. Walker has also worked on Wentworth.

In 2016, Walker received an Australian Writers' Guild nomination for "Episode 6381" of Home and Away in the Best Script for a Television Serial category.

Selected credits
Breakers – writer, story editor
Home and Away – writer, script editor, script producer (2007–08), story consultant
HeadLand (2005) – writer
All Saints – writer, script producer (2000–03)
Winners & Losers (2011) – developed, script producer
Wentworth (2013, 2015) – script consultant, Season 1 and story consultant, Season 4
Neighbours (2013–) – writer
Wonderland (2013–2015) – writer, co-creator, script producer

Books
 Simple Things - published by Pan Macmillan, 1996
 The Year of Freaking Out - published by Pan Macmillan, 1997
 Camphor Laurel - published by Pan Macmillan, 1998 (Winner Honour Children's Book of the Year)
 Water Colours - published by Hodder, 2000
 If Only - published by Published by Hodder Headline, 2001
 The Tin Man - published by Allen & Unwin, 2000
 Lucky Three - published by Hodder, 2003

References

External links

1965 births
Living people
Australian women screenwriters
Australian women novelists
Australian lesbian writers